The 2017 Allsvenskan, part of the 2017 Swedish football season, is the 93rd season of Allsvenskan since its establishment in 1924. The season began on 1 April 2017 and ended on 5 November the same year. Fixtures for the 2017 season were announced on 9 December 2016. A total of 16 teams participated.

Malmö FF were the defending champions after winning the title in the previous season. Malmö FF won the Swedish championship this season, their 23rd Allsvenskan title and 20th Swedish championship overall, in the 27th round on 16 October 2017 when they won 3–1 in the away fixture against IFK Norrköping at Östgötaporten.

Summary

Allsvenskans stora pris
For the fifth year running, the broadcaster of Allsvenskan, C More Entertainment, hosted an award ceremony where they presented seven awards and two special awards to the players and staff of the 16 Allsvenskan clubs, the award ceremony was held on 7 November 2017. The nominations for the 2017 season were officially announced on 3 November 2017. Nominees are displayed below, the winners are marked in bold text. Malmö FF and Djurgårdens IF received the most nominations with six nominations each, while Östersunds FK received three nominations, IFK Göteborg received two nominations, and AIK, BK Häcken, GIF Sundsvall, and IFK Norrköping each received one nomination.

Goalkeeper of the year
Johan Wiland (Hammarby IF/Malmö FF)
Andreas Isaksson (Djurgårdens IF)
Pontus Dahlberg (IFK Göteborg)

Defender of the year
Anton Tinnerholm (Malmö FF)
Per Karlsson (AIK)
Eric Larsson (GIF Sundsvall)

Midfielder of the year
Anders Christiansen (Malmö FF)
Ken Sema (Östersunds FK)
Magnus Eriksson (Djurgårdens IF)

Forward of the year
Saman Ghoddos (Östersunds FK)
Markus Rosenberg (Malmö FF)
Karl Holmberg (IFK Norrköping)

Newcomer of the year
Pontus Dahlberg (IFK Göteborg)
Felix Beijmo (Djurgårdens IF)
Daleho Irandust (BK Häcken)

Manager of the year
Graham Potter (Östersunds FK)
Magnus Pehrsson (Malmö FF)
Özcan Melkemichel (Djurgårdens IF)

Most valuable player of the year
Anders Christiansen (Malmö FF)
Magnus Eriksson (Djurgårdens IF)
Kim Källström (Djurgårdens IF)

Suspended matches

IFK Göteborg vs. AIK
The match at Gamla Ullevi between IFK Göteborg and AIK on 18 May 2017 was postponed, following reports of attempted match fixing. The match was rescheduled for 10 August 2017.

Teams

A total of sixteen teams are contesting the league, including thirteen sides from the previous season, two promoted teams from the 2016 Superettan and one team from the 2016 Allsvenskan play-offs.

Gefle IF and Falkenbergs FF were relegated at the end of the 2016 season after finishing in the bottom two places of the table. They were replaced by 2016 Superettan champions IK Sirius and runners-up AFC United. IK Sirius returned to Allsvenskan after 42 years' absence, having been relegated at the end of the 1974 season. This is IK Sirius' fourth season in the league. AFC United are participating in the league for the first time in the club's history; they are the third new club in the last four Allsvenskan seasons (following Falkenbergs FF in 2014 and Östersunds FK in 2016). 

The final spot will be taken by the 2016 Allsvenskan play-offs winner; Halmstads BK, third-placed team in 2016 Superettan.

Stadia and locations

 1 According to each club information page at the Swedish Football Association website for Allsvenskan.

Personnel and sponsoring
All teams are obligated to have the logo of the league sponsor Svenska Spel as well as the Allsvenskan logo on the right sleeve of their shirt. 

Note: Flags indicate national team as has been defined under FIFA eligibility rules. Players and Managers may hold more than one non-FIFA nationality.

Managerial changes

League table

Positions by round

Results

Play-offs
The 14th-placed team of Allsvenskan meets the third-placed team from 2017 Superettan in a two-legged tie on a home-and-away basis with the team from Allsvenskan finishing at home.

Trelleborgs FF won 3–1 on aggregate.

Season statistics

Top scorers

Top assists

Top goalkeepers
(Minimum of 10 games played)

Hat-tricks

Awards

Annual awards

See also

Competitions
 2017 Superettan
 2017 Division 1
 2016–17 Svenska Cupen
 2017–18 Svenska Cupen

Team seasons
 2017 AIK Fotboll season
 2017 Djurgårdens IF season
 2017 Hammarby Fotboll season
 2017 IFK Norrköping season
 2017 Malmö FF season

References

External links

 

2017
1
Sweden
Sweden